Blippar, which was one of the UK's first tech unicorns, specialises in augmented reality (AR) content creation and publishing to smartphones and the web.

Blippar's product offerings include in-house bespoke AR content creation, with a focus on mobile and WebAR, and a proprietary content creation and publishing platform, Blippbuilder, that enables users to create and publish AR content themselves. The company has its main offices in London.

Blippar has created AR campaigns for partners that include GSK, Porsche, Jaguar Land Rover, PepsiCo, Cadbury, L’Oréal, and Procter & Gamble. These campaigns have also included the world's first AR product launch, delivered in partnership with OnePlus Nord.

History

2011–2018: founding and financial history
Blippar was founded in 2011 by Ambarish Mitra, Omar Tayeb and Steve Spencer, after a discussion about the possibility of Queen Elizabeth II ‘coming to life’ from a twenty pound note.

At its launch on Android and iOS in August 2011, Blippar teamed up with Cadbury, to invite chocolate fans to play an AR game triggered by its packaging.

From then, Blippar has worked with various brands and campaigns. In 2014 it launched a new platform for Google Glass, enabling developers to create AR games using a person's eyes to control gameplay.

In 2015, Blippar launched an R&D lab to explore “innovative use cases” – not just for AR, but also for virtual reality (VR).

By the time of its $54 million Series D round of funding in early 2016, Blippar had been doubling down on its broader machine learning and AI efforts, with 60 engineers in its San Francisco and Mountain View offices, and 300 employees spread across 14 offices globally.

Although Blippar was one of AR's early pioneers, it was ahead of its time when it was founded in 2011 and the company was placed into administration in December 2018.

2019–present: financial recovery 
Blippar was bought out of administration in early 2019, when it sold its IP assets to an investment firm headed by Nick Candy. At the same time, the company appointed Faisal Galaria as CEO.

In 2021, Blippar secured a $5 million (approx €3.6 million) funding in a pre-Series A round, co-led by Chroma Ventures, the investment arm of Paddy Burns’ and Chris van der Kuyl's gaming company 4J Studios, and West Coast Capital; the private equity arm of Scottish entrepreneur Sir Tom Hunter and family. Canadian entrepreneur Anthony Lacavera also contributed to the round through his Globalive Capital investment firm.

Awards and recognition 
Blippar has been ranked in CNBC’s global ‘Disruptor 50’ list, as well as being named top Business Innovator by Bloomberg, and most innovative AR company by Fast Company in 2018. Blippar has won awards including best AR app at Mobile World Congress in 2017. The company was also shortlisted for the Most Effective Use of VR and AR at The Drum Awards for Digital Industries in 2020 for its work with OnePlus.

References

External links 
Official website

Augmented reality applications
Companies that have entered administration in the United Kingdom